Szlachecka may refer to the following places in Poland:

Szlachecka, Łódź Voivodeship
Szlachecka, Podkarpackie Voivodeship
Chomiąża Szlachecka
Chruszczewka Szlachecka
Dąbrowa Szlachecka
Długa Szlachecka
Dzierzązna Szlachecka
Glinka Szlachecka
Kamienica Szlachecka
Kępka Szlachecka
Klwatka Szlachecka
Nowa Wieś Szlachecka
Rewica Szlachecka
Topola Szlachecka
Tchórznica Szlachecka
Wierzbica Szlachecka
Wistka Szlachecka
Wólka Szlachecka

See also
Okolica szlachecka